Kurt W. Mortensen is the author of the  best selling book, Maximum Influence, first published in 2004 which also received the acclamation of Library Journal Business Book of the Year. Kurt was born in 1967 in Southern California. He currently lives with his wife Denita, and their four children Brooke, Mitchell, Bailey, and Madison in Provo, Utah, home to Brigham Young University where Mortensen received a bachelor's degree in Communications/Advertising  in 1992. Mortensen also received a MBA in Marketing and Consumer Behavior from the University of Pittsburgh in 1993.

Maximum Influence 

Maximum Influence, teaches that sales have changed and the consumer has become exponentially more skeptical and cynical within the last five years. Mortensen’s trademark is Magnetic Persuasion; rather than convincing others, he teaches that you should attract them, just like a magnet attracts metal filings.

Persuasion IQ 

Persuasion IQ, makes the case that the reason people become successful is their ability to persuade, their "Persuasion IQ" is the most important factor in business dealings, conflict resolution, and negotiation.

Bibliography 

 Maximum Influence, published in 2004.
 Persuasion IQ, published in 2008.

References 

 Library Journal

External links 

 Kurt Mortensen's official site

1967 births
Living people
American business writers
Brigham Young University alumni
Joseph M. Katz Graduate School of Business alumni
Writers from Provo, Utah